John Thomas Straffen (27 February 1930 – 19 November 2007) was a British serial killer who was the longest-serving prisoner in British history. After killing two young girls in the summer of 1951, he was found unfit to plead at trial and committed to Broadmoor Hospital. During a brief escape in 1952, he killed again. This time, Straffen was convicted of murder and sentenced to death. Reprieved because of his mental state, he had his sentence commuted to life imprisonment. Straffen remained in prison until his death after 55 years, 3 months, and 26 days of incarceration.

Early life
John Straffen's father, John Straffen Sr, was a soldier in the British Army. The younger Straffen was the third child in the family; his older sister was regarded as a "high grade mental defective" who died in 1952. Straffen was born at Bordon Camp in Hampshire, where his father was then based. When Straffen was two years old, his father was posted abroad and the family spent six years in India. Returning to the United Kingdom in March 1938, Straffen's father took a discharge from the Army and the family settled in Bath, Somerset.

In October 1938, Straffen was referred to a child guidance clinic for stealing and truancy. In June 1939, he first came before a juvenile court for stealing a purse from a girl and was given two years probation. Straffen's probation officer found that he did not understand the difference between right and wrong, or the meaning of probation. The family was living in crowded lodgings at the time, and Straffen's mother had no time to help, so the probation officer took the boy to a psychiatrist. As a result, Straffen was certified as a mental defective under the Mental Deficiency Act 1927. A report was compiled on Straffen in 1940 which assessed his I.Q. as 58 and placed his mental age at six. 

From June 1940, the local council sent Straffen to a residential school for mentally defective children, St Joseph's School in Sambourne, Warwickshire. Two years later, he moved to Besford Court, a senior school. Straffen was observed as a solitary boy who took correction very badly. At age 14, he was suspected of strangling two geese. At age 16, the school authorities undertook a review which found his I.Q. was 64 and his mental age was nine years six months, recommending his discharge.

Criminal career
Straffen returned home to Bath in March 1946, where the Medical Officer of Health examined him and found he still warranted certification under the Mental Deficiency Act. After several short-term jobs, he found a place as a machinist in a clothing factory. Early in 1947, Straffen began to enter unoccupied homes and steal small items to hide them; he never took them home or gave the items to others. Straffen had no friends and began stealing without being enticed by others.

On 27 July 1947, a 13-year-old girl reported to police that a boy called John had assaulted her by putting his hand over her mouth and saying, "What would you do if I killed you? I have done it before." This incident was not connected to Straffen at the time. Six weeks later, Straffen was found to have strangled five chickens belonging to the father of a girl with whom he had a row. When arrested, he was also under suspicion for burglary and, in his police interview, cheerfully confessed to it and many other incidents to which he had not been connected. Straffen was remanded in custody and the Medical Officer of HM Prison Horfield examined him, certifying that he was mentally retarded. On 10 October, he was committed to Hortham Colony in Bristol under the Mental Deficiency Act 1913.

Hortham was an "open" colony which specialised in training mentally disabled offenders for resettlement in the community. As Straffen had been under investigation for burglary, his certificate stated that he was "not of violent or dangerous propensities." He was well-behaved at Hortham and isolated from other inmates. As a result, in July 1949 he was transferred to a lower-security agricultural hostel in Winchester. There he did well initially, but fell back into old ways when he stole a bag of walnuts and was sent back to Hortham in February 1950. In August 1950, Straffen was in trouble with Hortham authorities when he went home without leave and resisted the police when they went to recapture him.

Mental health
In 1951, Straffen was examined at a Bristol hospital, where electroencephalograph readings showed that he had suffered "wide and severe damage to the cerebral cortex, probably from an attack of encephalitis in India before the age of six." By now, however, Straffen was considered sufficiently rehabilitated to be allowed a period of unescorted home leave. He used the time to gain a job at a market garden, which he was allowed to keep. Hortham licensed Straffen to the care of his mother, as the family home was less overcrowded. When Straffen's 21st birthday came, under the Mental Deficiency Act, he had to be reassessed by Hortham, which continued his certificate for a further five years; the family disputed the assessment and appealed. As a result, the Medical Officer of Health for Bath examined Straffen again on 10 July 1951 and found improvement in mental age to ten; he recommended that Straffen's certificate be renewed only for six months with a view to discharge at the end.

Child killings
According to Letitia Fairfield in the introduction to the Notable British Trials series volume about Straffen, he had a "smouldering hatred" and an "intense resentment" of the police and blamed them for all his troubles from the age of 8. On the morning of Straffen's assessment, a young girl named Christine Butcher was murdered. Fairfield speculates that Straffen saw the press coverage that followed and made the connection that strangling young girls gave the maximum amount of trouble to the police.

On 15 July 1951, Straffen visited the cinema unaccompanied. His route took him past 1 Camden Crescent in Bath, where 5-year-old Brenda Goddard lived with her foster parents. According to Straffen's later statement to the police, he saw Brenda gathering flowers and offered to show her a better place. He lifted Brenda over a fence into a copse, after which she fell and hit her head on a stone. She was unconscious, and he strangled her. Straffen did not make any attempt to hide the body and simply continued to the cinema to watch the film Shockproof and returned home.

Although Bath police had not previously suspected Straffen was violent, he was considered a suspect in the murder and interviewed by police on 3 August. Meanwhile, the police had visited his employer to check on his movements; this resulted in Straffen being dismissed on 31 July. In a later interview with a prison psychiatrist, Straffen said that he knew he was under suspicion and wanted to annoy the police, because he hated them for shadowing him.

On 8 August, Straffen was again at the cinema when he met 9-year-old Cicely Batstone. He first took Cicely to a different cinema to see another film and then went on the bus to a meadow known as "Tumps" on the outskirts of Bath. There he murdered her by strangulation. The circumstances of the crime left many witnesses who had seen Straffen with the girl. The bus conductor recognised him as a former workmate, a courting couple in the meadow had seen him very closely, and a policeman's wife had also seen the two together. She mentioned it to her husband; when the alarm was raised the next morning, she guided police to where she had seen the two, and Cicely's body was discovered. Her description of the man was enough to identify Straffen immediately as the suspect.

Arrest and conviction
Accordingly, the police drove to Straffen's home and arrested him for the murder of Cicely on the morning of 9 August. Straffen made a statement admitting he had killed Cicely and also confessed to the murder of Brenda: "The other girl, I did her the same." He was charged with murder and remanded in custody. On 31 August, after a two-day hearing at Bath Magistrates' Court, a date was set for Straffen's trial for the murder of Brenda.

At Taunton Assize Court, on 17 October 1951, Straffen stood trial for murder before Mr Justice Oliver. However, the only witness to be heard was Peter Parkes, medical officer at Horfield Prison, who testified to Straffen's medical history and stated his conclusion that Straffen was unfit to plead. Oliver commented, "In this country we do not try people who are insane. You might as well try a baby in arms. If a man cannot understand what is going on, he cannot be tried." The jury formally returned a verdict that Straffen was insane and unfit to plead.

Straffen was transferred to Broadmoor Hospital in Berkshire. Broadmoor had originally been termed a criminal lunatic asylum, but by the Criminal Justice Act 1948, responsibility for it had been transferred to the Ministry of Health and those committed to it had been renamed patients. In Broadmoor, Straffen was given a job as a cleaner.

Escape from Broadmoor and murder of Linda Bowyer
On 29 April 1952, Straffen managed to surmount Broadmoor's ten-foot wall by climbing onto the roof of a shed during a work detail. He was wearing civilian clothes under his work clothes. Some hours later he killed 5-year-old Linda Bowyer, who was riding her bicycle in Farley Hill. He was captured not long after.

Bowyer's body was found the next morning. Police questioned Straffen before news reached the hospital, asking him whether he had committed a crime while free; he replied, "I did not kill her" and (before police mentioned anything about a bicycle) "I did not kill the little girl on the bicycle." He was charged with the murder of Linda, and sent to HM Prison Brixton while awaiting trial since Broadmoor had failed to hold him.

A system of sirens to warn of any escape from Broadmoor was set up later in 1952. When Straffen's murder trial opened on 21 July, he pleaded not guilty, and the defence opted to leave the question of his sanity as an issue to be determined by the jury. At the request of the prosecution (led by the Solicitor-General, Sir Reginald Manningham-Buller) the judge ruled that evidence about the prior murders in Bath would be admissible.

That evening, one of the jurors attended a club and declared that one of the prosecution witnesses had murdered Bowyer. The next morning the judge announced that the jury would be discharged and the trial rebegun with a new jury. The judge required the errant juror to remain in court throughout the trial, before calling him to apologise for his "wicked discharge of your duties as a citizen".

Straffen's defence called several of those who had seen him in earlier years to give evidence about his mental condition. The prosecution then called prison medical officers and psychiatrists to give evidence in rebuttal. Dr Thomas Munro, who was a specialist in mental deficiency and had seen Straffen, testified that he had said that to murder was wrong because it was breaking the law and because "it is one of the commandments". When Munro asked Straffen to name the other commandments, Straffen could only remember four.

After retiring for just under an hour, the jury returned with a verdict of guilty, which implicitly declared Straffen sane. Mr Justice Cassels sentenced Straffen to death. Straffen appealed on the grounds that the evidence about the Bath murders was wrongly admitted, and that his statements on the morning after Linda's murder were wrongly admitted because they had been made before he was cautioned. Both grounds of the appeal were dismissed, and Straffen was refused leave to appeal to the House of Lords. The date for execution of the judgment of death was fixed for 4 September. However, on 29 August, it was announced that Home Secretary David Maxwell Fyfe had recommended to the Queen that Straffen be reprieved.

Reprieve and prison
After his reprieve, Straffen was moved to HM Prison Wandsworth. In November 1952, the Home Office denied a rumour that he was about to be moved to the Rampton mental institution. In 1956, Straffen was moved to Horfield Prison after officers discovered an escape attempt by Wandsworth prisoners who intended to take Straffen with them as a diversion. The news caused extreme concern in Bristol, and a petition demanding his removal was organised by a local councillor and signed by 12,000 people within weeks.

While in Horfield, Straffen was described by former politician Peter Baker, briefly a fellow prisoner, as always being conspicuous when he was exercising, being much taller than anyone else and wearing distinctive clothing for a special watch prisoner. Baker thought the "long, emaciated, miserable figure" looked "like a dying butterfly or a caged animal" and reported rumours Straffen made application to the governor each month on the chance a date had been set for his release. In August 1958, Straffen was moved to HM Prison Cardiff when the regime at Horfield was changed to a more liberal one. However, he was reported to have been transferred back in June 1960.

A new 28-cell high-security wing at HM Prison Parkhurst was built and ready for opening in early 1966. The Home Office pointedly did not deny rumours that Straffen had been secretly transferred there on 31 January 1966.

In May 1968, Straffen was moved to HM Prison Durham. Placed in the top security E wing, he was joined by another child killer, Ian Brady (who would eventually succeed Straffen as the United Kingdom's longest actively-serving prisoner). Crime author Jonathan Goodman wrote that "the shambling lunatic [Straffen] ... is in prison only because no mental institution is secure enough to guarantee his confinement." Many years later, a prison officer recalled seeing Straffen "circling, banging the fence every couple of minutes" and that one fellow officer described him as aloof and hostile: "Never talks unless he has to ask for something. Always on his own".

Sentencing terms
For most of the time that Straffen was in prison, the Home Secretary had to agree to the release of any life sentence prisoner; no occupant of the office was ever willing to let Straffen out. In 1994, Michael Howard decided to compile a select list of about twenty prisoners serving life sentences who must never be released, and Straffen's name was said to be on it. The whole list was published by the News of the World in December 1997; this report confirmed that Straffen would spend the rest of his life in prison.

In 2001, with the fiftieth anniversary of Straffen's imprisonment approaching, his solicitors called for his case to be reopened on the grounds that he had not been fit to stand trial. Investigative journalist Bob Woffinden, who examined previously confidential records, uncovered that Straffen had been reprieved after a majority of doctors who examined him found that he was insane. Woffinden also doubted Straffen's guilt in the murder of Linda, because he had no fingernails with which to cause injuries seen on her body and because some local witnesses placed the time of the murder after his recapture. However, Straffen's application to the Criminal Cases Review Commission was turned down in December 2002.

In May 2002, the European Court of Human Rights decided a case brought by a life sentence prisoner which challenged the authority of the Home Secretary to refuse to release him after the Parole Board recommended he be freed. The court decided that politicians should not interfere in life sentences and therefore current practice was unlawful. It was immediately observed that this meant an opportunity for release for Straffen, who had been in HM Prison Long Lartin since 2000.

Death
Straffen died at HM Prison Frankland in County Durham on 19 November 2007 at the age of 77. He had been in prison for a British record of 55 years, 3 months, and 26 days, or a total of 20,206 days.

See also
 List of serial killers in the United Kingdom

Notes

References

.

External links
Case details - Examines the possibility that Straffen was not guilty of the third murder

1930 births
1951 murders in the United Kingdom
1952 murders in the United Kingdom
2007 deaths
20th-century English criminals
British people convicted of theft
English escapees
English murderers of children
English people convicted of murder
English people who died in prison custody
English prisoners sentenced to death
English serial killers
Escapees from England and Wales detention
Male serial killers
People detained at Broadmoor Hospital
People from East Hampshire District
Prisoners sentenced to death by England and Wales
Prisoners who died in England and Wales detention
Serial killers who died in prison custody